Frederick George Kerr-Dineen was an Anglican priest in the 20th century.

He was born on 26 August 1915 and educated at St John's College, Durham. He was ordained in 1941 and was a curate at St Paul's Portman Square and St John's Weymouth. In 1952 he married Hermione Iris MacDonald. He held incumbencies at  St Michael's Blackheath Park and Holy Trinity, Eastbourne before being appointed Archdeacon of Chichester in 1973. Two years later he became the first Archdeacon of Horsham, retiring from the position in 1983 and as Rector of Stopham and Hardham in 1987. He died on 6 July 1988.

Notes

1915 births
Archdeacons of Chichester
Archdeacons of Horsham
1988 deaths
Alumni of St John's College, Durham